Solo Razafinarivo (born 5 January 1938) is a former Malagasy cyclist. He competed in the individual road race at the 1968 Summer Olympics.

References

External links
 

1938 births
Living people
Malagasy male cyclists
Olympic cyclists of Madagascar
Cyclists at the 1968 Summer Olympics
People from Antsirabe